Kyle Cheney (born 25 August 1989) is a former Australian rules football player who played with the Melbourne Football Club, Hawthorn Football Club, and Adelaide Football Club in the Australian Football League. He was traded to  after the 2010 season, and then to Adelaide at the end of 2014.

AFL career

Melbourne (2008–2010)
Cheney played the whole 2008 season for Sandringham in the VFL. He played 12 matches for Melbourne in 2009 but only two in 2010, playing the rest of the season with the Casey Scorpions and winning their player of the year award that year. At the end of the 2010 season, Cheney was traded to  along with pick 66 for pick 52.

Hawthorn (2011–2014)
Cheney played his first game for Hawthorn midway through 2011, against . He played in eight games that season, kicking his first AFL goal against , and six matches in 2012. In 2013 Cheney played just four AFL games due to the form of his teammates in a premiership year for the club. He played the rest of the year with Hawthorn's VFL affiliate, the Box Hill Hawks, and won the best and fairest award for Box Hill, averaging 17.8 disposals and 7.7 marks playing in defence and helping Box Hill win the VFL premiership that year. In 2014, Cheney played the opening nine games of the season as a key defender for the injury-hit Hawks, before failing to break into the side for the rest of the season.

Adelaide (2015–2018)
Cheney played an equal career-best 12 games in his first season at Adelaide despite interruptions due to injury, thriving as a versatile defender with an average of 4.8 spoils per game (ranked second at the club) at 75.9% efficiency (first). At the end of the season, Cheney was issued with a warning by the AFL after unintentionally starting and facilitating an allegation that  defender Michael Talia had shared sensitive information with his brother, Adelaide defender Daniel Talia, ahead of their two clubs meeting in the 2015 Second Elimination Final, an allegation the pair were cleared of. Kyle was Delisted at the end of the 2018 season.

Statistics

|- style=background:#EAEAEA
| 2008 ||  || 25
| 0 || — || — || — || — || — || — || — || — || — || — || — || — || — || — || 0
|-
| 2009 ||  || 25
| 12 || 0 || 0 || 89 || 102 || 191 || 64 || 20 || 0.0 || 0.0 || 7.4 || 8.5 || 15.9 || 5.3 || 1.7 || 0
|- style=background:#EAEAEA
| 2010 ||  || 25
| 2 || 0 || 0 || 17 || 7 || 24 || 11 || 3 || 0.0 || 0.0 || 8.5 || 3.5 || 12.0 || 5.5 || 1.5 || 0
|-
| 2011 ||  || 13
| 8 || 1 || 0 || 57 || 52 || 109 || 38 || 5 || 0.1 || 0.0 || 7.1 || 6.5 || 13.6 || 4.8 || 0.6 || 0
|- style=background:#EAEAEA
| 2012 ||  || 13
| 6 || 1 || 1 || 24 || 37 || 61 || 17 || 12 || 0.2 || 0.2 || 4.0 || 6.2 || 10.2 || 2.8 || 2.0 || 0
|- 
| 2013 ||  || 13
| 4 || 0 || 1 || 30 || 23 || 53 || 14 || 9 || 0.0 || 0.3 || 7.5 || 5.8 || 13.3 || 3.5 || 2.3 || 0
|- style=background:#EAEAEA
| 2014 ||  || 13
| 9 || 0 || 0 || 81 || 56 || 137 || 37 || 12 || 0.0 || 0.0 || 9.0 || 6.2 || 15.2 || 4.1 || 1.3 || 0
|-
| 2015 ||  || 25
| 12 || 0 || 0 || 116 || 46 || 162 || 57 || 23 || 0.0 || 0.0 || 9.7 || 3.8 || 13.5 || 4.8 || 1.9 || 0
|- style=background:#EAEAEA
| 2016 ||  || 25
| 24 || 0 || 1 || 193 || 131 || 324 || 125 || 37 || 0.0 || 0.0 || 8.0 || 5.5 || 13.5 || 5.2 || 1.5 || 0
|-
| 2017 ||  || 25
| 0 || — || — || — || — || — || — || — || — || — || — || — || — || — || — || 0
|- style=background:#EAEAEA
| 2018 ||  || 25
| 8 || 0 || 0 || 84 || 28 || 112 || 44 || 4 || 0.0 || 0.0 || 10.5 || 3.5 || 14.0 || 5.5 || 0.5 || 0
|- class="sortbottom"
! colspan=3| Career
! 85 !! 2 !! 3 !! 691 !! 482 !! 1173 !! 407 !! 125 !! 0.0 !! 0.0 !! 8.1 !! 5.7 !! 13.8 !! 4.8 !! 1.5 !! 0
|}

Honours and achievements
Team
 2× Minor premiership: 2012, 2013
 VFL premiership player: 2013

Individual
 Col Austen Trophy: 2013
 Box Hill Hawks All–Stars team (1999–2019)

References

External links

1989 births
Living people
Melbourne Football Club players
Hawthorn Football Club players
Adelaide Football Club players
Box Hill Football Club players
Australian rules footballers from Victoria (Australia)
Greater Western Victoria Rebels players
Casey Demons players
Adelaide Football Club (SANFL) players
Sandringham Football Club players